Trinquier is a surname. Notable people with the surname include:

 Angélique Trinquier (born 1991), Monégasque swimmer
 Michel Trinquier (born 1931), French painter
 Roger Trinquier (1908–1986), French Army officer and counter-insurgency theorist

French-language surnames